is a Japanese manga artist and singer. She is included in the Year 24 Group, by some, although her status as one of them has been debated due to a focus more on epic stories than the internal psychology of those mangaka. She was one of the most popular Japanese comic artists in the 1970s, being best known for The Rose of Versailles.

Education 
Ikeda was a philosophy major and a member of the Democratic Youth League of Japan. She would later drop out.

Career 
Ikeda began publishing manga in the magazine Kashihonya while studying philosophy. She debuted in 1967 with Bara Yashiki no Shōjo.

Ikeda has written and illustrated many shōjo manga, many of which are based on historical events, such as the French Revolution or the Russian Revolution. Her use of foreign settings and androgynous themes made The Rose of Versailles and Orpheus no Mado enormous successes.

Her most famous manga is The Rose of Versailles, also known as Lady Oscar in Europe. This manga, loosely based on the French Revolution, has been made into several Takarazuka musicals and into an anime series and a live-action film. After Rose of Versailles concluded, Ikeda wrote articles for Asahi Shimbun. In the 2000s Ikeda studied at a music school and became a singer. Her voice is in the soprano range. She made a comeback to the comic industry as a script writer in 1999.  Her recent manga includes Der Ring des Nibelungen. It is a manga version of the opera written by Richard Wagner.

In 2008, she received France's Ordre national de la Légion d'honneur for her contribution to Japan's cultural awareness of France, and she has been a guest of the 2011 Angoulême International Comics Festival.

Works 
 Bara Yashiki no Shōjo (1967) — short story
 Soyo Kaze no Mary — short story
 Francesca no Shouzou (1969)
 Sokoku ni Ai o (1969)
 Freesia no Asa (1970)
 Futari Pocchi (1971)
 Ikite te Yokatta! (1971)
 Jinchouge (1971)
 Mariko (1971)
 Sakura Kyou (1972)
 The Rose of Versailles (1972)
 Shiroi Egmont (1973)
 Yureru Soushun (1973)
 Shōko no Etude (1974)
 Dear Brother (1974)
 Orpheus no Mado (1975)
 Claudine (1978)
 Ayako (1980)
 Epitaram: A Wedding Song (1981)
 Aoi Zakuro (1982)
 Jotei Ecatherina (1982)
 Versailles no Bara Gaiden (1984) — extra chapters for The Rose of Versailles
 Eikou no Napoleon – Eroica (1986)
 Glass no Yami (1987)
 Mijo Monogatari (1988)
 Kasuganotsubon - Kefuzo Kataku o (1989)
 Porando Hishi Ten no Hate Made (1990) — Poland's Secret Story: To the Borders of Heaven
 Shoutoku Taishi (1991)
 Fuyu no Shukusai (1997)
 Elizabeth (1999) — text only; art by Erika Miyamoto
 Niberunku no Yubiwa (2000) — Der Ring des Nibelungen
 Ikeda Riyoko the Best: Ai to Tatakau Onnatachi (2001)
 Falcon no Meikishu (2004)
 Ai wa Waltz ni Nosete (2005)
 BeruBara Kids (2006) — The Rose of Versailles Kids (parody)
 Haru no Yuki (2006) — Spring Snow
 The Legend (Taiōshijinki) (2007)
 Taketori Monogatari (2014)

References

External links 
 Riyoko Ikeda's Official Site

 
1947 births
Chevaliers of the Légion d'honneur
Japanese female comics artists
Japanese sopranos
Living people
University of Tsukuba alumni
Musicians from Osaka
21st-century Japanese singers
Women manga artists
Manga artists from Osaka Prefecture
Musicians from Osaka Prefecture
21st-century Japanese writers
21st-century Japanese women writers
21st-century Japanese women singers
Recipients of the Legion of Honour